Aprasia picturata is a species of lizard in the family Pygopodidae. It is endemic to Australia.

References

Pygopodids of Australia
Aprasia
Reptiles described in 1999
Endemic fauna of Australia